Kenneth or Ken Scott may refer to:

 Ken Scott (born 1947), English record producer and recording engineer
 Ken Scott (actor) (1928–1986), American film and television actor
 Ken Scott (Australian footballer) (1926–2012), Australian footballer for Footscray
 Ken Scott (English footballer) (born 1931), English footballer for Derby County and Mansfield Town
 Ken Scott (filmmaker) (born 1970), Canadian screenwriter, actor, director and comedian
 Kenn Scott, Canadian screenwriter and academic
 Kenneth Scott (courtier) (1931–2018), Deputy Private Secretary to Queen Elizabeth II
 Kenneth Scott (cricketer) (1915–1943), English cricketer
 Kenneth D. Scott (born 1930), American politician from Iowa
 Kenneth E. Scott (1928–2016), American lawyer
 Kenneth Kamal Scott (1940–2015), singer, dancer and actor